AMTK may refer to one of the following:
America's Most Talented Kid, a former U.S. talent/reality TV series
Amtrak, the National Railroad Passenger Corporation of the United States, which has a reporting mark AMTK